Yarrow Mamout (c. 1736 – January 19, 1823) was a formerly enslaved African entrepreneur and property owner in Georgetown, Washington, D.C. An educated Fulani Muslim, he gained his freedom in 1796 after 44 years as a slave. James Alexander Simpson and Charles Willson Peale painted his portrait, Peale's being held in the Philadelphia Museum of Art.

Early life 
Yarrow was born in West Africa circa 1736. His African name was probably Mamadou Yarrow (the name Yarrow Mamout was popularized through the diary of his portraitist, Charles Willson Peale). He was enslaved and taken to Annapolis, Maryland, from Guinea in 1752 on the slave ship Elijah. A member of the Fulani people, he spoke the Fula language and could read and write Arabic and rudimentary English. Historians believe that he came from a wealthy and educated Muslim family.

Slavery
Upon his arrival in Maryland, Yarrow was sold to Samuel Beall, who owned a plantation in Takoma Park. He became Beall's manservant and later served his son, Brooke. By 1790, Yarrow had moved with Beall to Georgetown and begun hiring himself out for wages. According to contemporaneous sources, Beall required him to turn over wages he earned during the day but allowed him to keep wages he received for nocturnal work. He became a jack of all trades, working as a brick maker, charcoal burner, basket weaver, cart driver, and stevedore, working long hours to earn enough money to buy his own freedom.

After 44 years of slavery, Yarrow gained freedom at the age of 60 when Brooke Beall died in 1796, manumitted by owners who believed him too old to work anymore. He immediately spent £20 to buy and free his seven-year-old son, Aquilla, who had been born into slavery on a neighboring farm. Little is known of the boy's mother.

Freedom
Yarrow amassed savings in the amount of $200 and became one of the first investors in the successful Columbia Bank of Georgetown. In 1800, he purchased a lot located at 3324 Dent Place NW in Georgetown, valued in a tax assessment at $30. He constructed a log house on the land. By 1816, the property had an assessed value of $500. Yarrow lived quietly on the dividends of his bank stock. He remained a devout lifelong Muslim, praying regularly and avoiding consumption of pork and liquor.

On March 23, 1821, Yarrow loaned $170.85 to a white merchant named William Hayman to help purchase a warehouse. Hayman defaulted on the loan after Yarrow's death, but Nancy Hillman, the daughter of Yarrow's sister, sued to recoup the loss in 1843. She received $300 from the foreclosure and sale of the warehouse in 1850.

Yarrow died on January 19, 1823, at the approximate age of 86. According to his obituary, penned by Charles Willson Peale, he was buried in the corner of his yard where he was accustomed to pray, though a 2015 archaeological dig failed to unearth any remains. Peale's obituary was published in the Gettysburg Compiler and was reproduced in 38 newspapers across the United States, testifying to the unique life story of the African Muslim slave turned entrepreneur and property owner.

Descendents 
Two years after his father's death, Aquilla purchased a farm in Washington County, Maryland, and moved there with his wife, Mary "Polly" Turner, a midwife and former slave. The community of Yarrowsburg, Maryland, was named in her honor. Her great-grandnephew, Robert Turner Ford, graduated from Harvard University in 1927.

Portraits

There are two known portraits of Yarrow, painted by James Alexander Simpson and Charles Willson Peale. Painted in 1819, Peale's portrait showed Yarrow at the age of 83, though rumor put his age at 134. Simpson painted Yarrow's portrait in 1822. They are held in the permanent collections of the District of Columbia Public Library (Simpson) and the Philadelphia Museum of Art (Peale). Simpson's was exhibited at the National Portrait Gallery in 2016. In this portrait, Mamout wears a hat resembling a kufi.

See also
Fula Americans
Omar Ibn Said
Ayuba Suleiman Diallo
Islam In the United States

Further reading

References

1730s births
1823 deaths
18th-century American slaves
Free Negroes
Fula people
American slaves literate in Arabic
American Muslim slaves
American people of Guinean descent
African-American Muslims
American people of Fulbe descent
People from Georgetown (Washington, D.C.)